Robert C. Cashner is an American ichthyologist and retired academic administrator.

He was the first to describe the Stippled studfish (Fundulus bifax) and the bluefin stoneroller (Campostoma pauciradii).

Cashner was a faculty member at the University of New Orleans for many years. He was dean of UNO's graduate school from 1996 to 2008 and vice chancellor for research from 2001 to 2008. He was elected as president of the American Society of Ichthyologists and Herpetologists in 1997.

Taxon described by him
See :Category:Taxa named by Robert Cashner

Selected publications
</ref>

</ref>

Cashner, R.C., J.S. Rogers and J.M. Grady 1988 Fundulus bifax, a new species of the subgenus Xenisma from the Tallapoosa and Coosa river systems of Alabama and Georgia. Copeia (3):674-683.

Bart, H. L., M. F. Cashner, and K. R. Piller. 2011. Phylogenetic relationships of the North American cyprinid subgenus hydropholax. Molecular Phylogenetics and Evolution 59:725-735.

References

Lyon College alumni
University of Arkansas alumni
Tulane University alumni
American ichthyologists
University of New Orleans faculty
Living people
1940s births